WESE (92.5 FM), known as "92.5 The Beat", is an urban contemporary radio station based in Guntown, Mississippi, United States, and serves Tupelo and Northeast Mississippi with an ERP of 12,000 watts. WESE is owned by iHeartMedia, Inc., through licensee iHM Licenses, LLC.

External links

ESE
Urban contemporary radio stations in the United States
Radio stations established in 1982
IHeartMedia radio stations